American Crime Story is an American true crime television series developed by Scott Alexander and Larry Karaszewski, who are executive producers with Brad Falchuk, Nina Jacobson, Ryan Murphy, and Brad Simpson. Described as an anthology series, and similarly to American Horror Story, each season is presented as a self-contained miniseries, following separate unrelated true events. Series creators Alexander and Karaszewski did not return after the first season.

The first season, subtitled The People v. O. J. Simpson, presents the murder trial of O. J. Simpson, based on Jeffrey Toobin's book The Run of His Life: The People v. O. J. Simpson. The second season, subtitled The Assassination of Gianni Versace, explores the murder of designer Gianni Versace by serial killer Andrew Cunanan, based on Maureen Orth's book Vulgar Favors: Andrew Cunanan, Gianni Versace, and the Largest Failed Manhunt in U. S. History.

Originally, a season based on Hurricane Katrina was intended to air, and would have featured Sarah Paulson in the role of Dr. Anna Pou, however the season was later scrapped.

Cast members

References

American Crime Story
American Crime Story